Theodore Leo Moritz (February 10, 1892 – March 13, 1982) was a Democratic member of the U.S. House of Representatives from Pennsylvania.

He was born in Toledo, Ohio. He graduated from St. Mary’s Institute in Dayton, Ohio, in 1913, and the University of Dayton in 1919. He attended the law department of the Duquesne University in Pittsburgh, Pennsylvania, from 1920 to 1923. He was engaged as a teacher in parochial schools in Dayton from 1910 to 1913, in Cleveland, Ohio, from 1913 to 1916, and in the Duquesne University Prep School in Pittsburgh from 1918 to 1923. He was admitted to the bar in 1924 and commenced practice in Pittsburgh in 1925. He served as secretary to the Mayor of Pittsburgh from 1933 to 1935.

Moritz was elected as a Democrat to the Seventy-fourth Congress.  He did not seek renomination as a Democrat, but was an unsuccessful candidate for nomination as a Republican and ran for reelection as an Independent candidate in 1936.

Sources

The Political Graveyard

Moritz, Theodore L.
Moritz, Theodore L.
Politicians from Dayton, Ohio
University of Dayton alumni
Duquesne University alumni
Democratic Party members of the United States House of Representatives from Pennsylvania
Pennsylvania Republicans
Pennsylvania Independents
20th-century American politicians